Gorsley Common is a village in Herefordshire, west of Gorsley and  Kilcot and east of Linton.

References

External links
 

Villages in Herefordshire